The Biophilia Tour was the seventh concert tour by Icelandic musician Björk. The tour was centered on her multimedia project and studio album Biophilia (2011). The tour premiered at the Manchester International Festival and visited Europe, Americas, Asia, including her first visit to Taiwan, and featured the first performance in Africa.

The tour schedule featured both a residency format, with a "in-the-round" stage, in which the singer would perform at the same place during different nights, and a conventional stage format for the festival dates. For the tour and the album, the singer conceived a series of new musical instruments, which were controlled on stage by tablets. Björk wore different nature-inspired dresses by Michael van der Ham, Iris van Herpen, Kokon to Zai and Jeremy Scott. The tour was lauded by music critics.

A documentary on the concept and recording of the album, When Björk Met Attenborough, included different partial performances from the tour, while a concert film, called Björk: Biophilia Live, which chronicled the last full Biophilia concert in London, premiered at the 2014 Tribeca Film Festival.

Background 
At the end of 2010, Björk confirmed she was working on a new album. In an interview published on Fréttablaðið, the singer stated that the project was midway through the completion and that she hoped to go on tour before the end of 2011. Björk originally conceived the idea for the tour as a house in Iceland where each room would represent a song from the album. When she was contacted from National Geographic they proposed to produce a 3D film from that original idea. Because of that, the singer contacted long time collaborator Michel Gondry and they started to write a script for the movie. Because of the director conflicting schedule with the editing of The Green Hornet, the project was scrapped.

The project was officialised in March 2011, with the announcement of Björk performance at Manchester International Festival. The project, called Biophilia, comprises a series of live performances, a new website, a documentary and a series of apps, besides the release as a music album which is partly composed on an iPad. The Biophilia Tour was said to be touring eight cities for three years and to be including a series of workshops for children in collaboration with local schools.

Six performances were planned for the residency in Manchester, with one show being added later and dubbed as a "preview show" on June 27, 2011. In July 2011, Björk was announced as the headliner of Bestival, her only planned outdoor concert of that year.  On July 8, 2011, the second residency was announced to be at Harpa in Reykjavík, with six shows planned.  The first two shows were also part of Iceland Airwaves.  Due to high demand, two more shows were announced, with a last one being announced later. The Icelandic residency went sold out.

In the beginning of 2012, the third residency was announced to take place in New York City, in partnership with The Creators Project and the New York Hall of Science, where six of the ten planned gigs were announced to take place, with the other four being at Roseland Ballroom.  However, due to an illness, one show that was to take place at the Hall of Science was rescheduled and moved to the Roseland Ballroom. After the end of the residency, another one was announced at Centro de Exposiciones of Buenos Aires, with the last show taking place at the Estadio G.E.B.A. However, due to the discovery of a nodule on her vocal cords, Björk had to cancel the last show at the Centro de Exposiciones and the concert at the Estadio G.E.B.A. For this reason, Björk cancelled several festival appearances she was supposed to have during the summer of 2012. In November 2012, the singer announced that she underwent surgery to remove the nodule.

The tour started again in February 2013, with the fifth residency in Paris, where four concerts took place at the Cirque en Chantier on the Île Seguin and two at the Zénith de Paris. When a fund-raising project appeared on the website for the company Kickstarter, it was stated that the Biophilia Tour would visit San Francisco, Los Angeles and Tokyo as the next residencies.  The California residency was announced on April 1, 2013, with three dates in Richmond, and three in Los Angeles. Once again, because of ticket requests, another date at the Hollywood Palladium was added. On May 21, 2013, the website of music promoters Smash was updated with details on the last Biophilia residency at the Miraikan museum in Tokyo, with three dates to take place at the end of July and the beginning of August. After an announcement was previewed on Björk's official Facebook page, on June 10, 2013, the last Biophilia concert with the "in round format" was announced at the Alexandra Palace of London.

Concert synopsis

Many instruments were created and brought on stage specifically for the shows: a tesla coil, a bespoke pipe organ that accepts digital information, a pin-barrel harp, a midi-controlled gamelan-celesta hybrid, and a pendulum-harp that harnesses the earth’s gravitational pull to create musical patterns. Musicians include Max Weisel (app developer), Matt Robertson (electronics, midi instruments and musical director), Manu Delago (hang drum and percussion), the Icelandic Female Choir and Jón Stefánsson (choir conductor). Jónas Sen (harpsichord, pipe organ and gameleste) also participated in the concerts during the Reykjavík and Paris residencies. Zeena Parkins joined the tour for the North American residencies. Animations by Stephen Malinowski are shown during the performances.  A total of 40 songs have been performed.

The show is conceived the following way: the stage is in the middle of the venue with a standing area around it and seats in the background. Björk considered the idea of the circular structure very important since the instruments are set all through the stage and people can flow around it to see all of them. Björk also wanted in to have an intimate, close feeling.

Most of Björk's all-time songs were reworked to fit the aesthetics of the show and were played with the new instruments commissioned exclusively for that purpose. Thus, "Jóga" was played with a pipe organ instead of its characteristical set of strings; "One Day", "Venus as a Boy" and "Possibly Maybe" were played with a hang drum; "You've Been Flirting Again" used a choral arrangement and "Declare Independence", "Pluto", "Possibly Maybe" and "Army of Me" included the performance of a Tesla coil. During the shows in Iceland and Paris, keyboarder Jónas Sen joined to play new versions of "Pleasure is All Mine" on organ and "Vertebrae by Vertebrae" and "Sacrifice" on the harpsichord. Harpist Zeena Parkins joined during the American legs of the tour and also played a reworked version of "Sacrifice" with a harp.

Broadcasts and recordings 

When the Biophilia project was first unveiled, it was announced that a documentary including footage of studio recording, interviews and rehearsal for the live performances, which would culminate in the first live performance at the Manchester International Festival, was in the works. It was also stated that the Manual Edition of Biophilia would include essays by Nikki Dibben, design, drawing and live photography by M/M Paris, additional photography by Inez van Lamsweerde and Vinoodh Matadin, along with a bonus disc of exclusive material. Before the release of the album it was confirmed that the second disc would include a live recording of the Biophilia show in Manchester. The live recording of "Solstice" that was included in this disc is the official version featured in the Biophilia album. After the debut of the residency, the official website of the Manchester International Festival posted footage from the show, including snippets from "Thunderbolt" and "Moon". Another snippet from the latter performance was shown on BBC Scotland. On November 3, 2011, the performance of "Thunderbolt" was released as a music video on Spotify.

While the original idea for the documentary never materialised, the project evolved as a mutual collaboration between David Attenborough and Björk herself. The English naturalist had previously provided the spoken introduction for the live shows and the apps. The documentary, directed by Louise Hooper, explored the relation between men, music and technology and blends with rehearsal footage from the Biophilia Tour and snippets from the live show. The forementioned performance of "Thunderbolt" in Manchester is partially included, along with a partial recording of "Cosmogony" live at the 2012 World Sacred Music Festival in Fes. It was narrated by English actress Tilda Swinton and, along with a discussion between Attenborough and Björk, included interventions by British-American neurologist Oliver Sacks. The documentary first aired on Channel 4 on July 27, 2013 as When Björk Met Attenborough. On March 21, 2014, it was announced that the documentary would be released on May 5, 2014 on DVD and Blu-ray.

After Björk dedicated "Declare Independence" to the Pussy Riot, Pitchfork posted a recording from the performance at Flow Festival in Helsinki. When the fifth Biophilia residency was announced in Paris, it was specified that the February 27, 2013, concert at the Cirque en Chantier would be filmed. However, this not realised. After the start of the residency in San Francisco, an Instagram account which was opened to follow the Tour was followed by a three-part video diary of the behind the scenes and rehearsal of the San Francisco shows. The three videos were released on May 21, May 23 and May 25, respectively. The Instagram account has posted several short videos of rehearsal and photos from the Tour. The September 3, 2013 show at Alexandra Palace in London was recorded. On March 26, 2014, the recording was confirmed to have its worldwide debut at the 2014 Tribeca Film Festival on April 26, 2014. The film, aptly called Björk: Biophilia Live was directed by Peter Strickland and Nick Fenton.

Opening acts 
 Leila Arab (Zénith de Paris concerts) 
 These New Puritans (Hollywood Bowl concert)
 Death Grips (Echo Beach concert) 
 Mykki Blanco (Echo Beach concert)

Songs performed

Tour dates

Festivals performances

Cancellations and rescheduled shows

Awards and nominations

Icelandic Music Awards

!Ref.
|-
|2011
| Biophilia Tour live at Harpa 
| Musical Event of the Year 
| 
|  
|}

Lunas del Auditorio

!Ref.
|-
| 2012 || Biophilia Tour live at Cumbre Tajín|| Alternative Performance  ||  ||

References

External links
2011 gigography at bjork.com
2012 gigography at bjork.com
2013 gigography at bjork.com

Björk concert tours
2011 concert tours
2012 concert tours
2013 concert tours